Stationary Traveller is the tenth studio album by English progressive rock band Camel. Like much of Camel's output, it is a concept album, in this case centering on the trials of East German refugees attempting to cross the Berlin Wall from East Berlin into West Berlin. The album also touches on the theme of politics between the two different government ideologies. It is the last Camel album to be recorded on the Decca label.

The album was recorded at Riverside Studios, England.  It was mixed in Los Angeles, California and mastered at The Mastering Lab, Los Angeles.

Track listings
All songs written by Andy Latimer and Susan Hoover, except where noted

Original Release (1984)
Side One
 "Pressure Points" (Latimer) – 2:11
 Haydn Bendall -  Synthesizer, Fairlight CMI, mixing
 Andy Latimer - all other instruments, mixing
 "Refugee" – 3:37
 Andy Latimer - guitar, lead vocals, piano, bass
 Ton Scherpenzeel - accordion
  Paul Burgess - drums
 "Vopos" – 5:22
 Andy Latimer - guitar, lead vocals, piano, synthesizers, Drum machine
 Haydn Bendall - Synthesizers, Fairlight 
 Ton Scherpenzeel - Yamaha CS-80 and Prophet-5 synthesizer
 David Paton - bass
 "Cloak and Dagger Man" – 3:42
 Andy Latimer - electric and 12-string guitars
 Chris Rainbow - lead vocals
 Ton Scherpenzeel - Prophet and Juno 60 synthesizers
 David Paton - bass
 Paul Burgess - drums
 "Stationary Traveller" (Latimer) – 5:27
 Andy Latimer - electric and classical guitars, pan pipes, bass
 Ton Scherpenzeel - Prophet, PPG and Juno 60 synthesizers, grand piano
 Paul Burgess - drums

Side Two
 "West Berlin" – 4:58
 Andy Latimer - guitar, lead vocals, bass
 Ton Scherpenzeel - Prophet and PPG synthesizers, grand piano
 Paul Burgess - drums
 "Fingertips" – 4:21
 Andy Latimer - drumulator, lead vocals
 Ton Scherpenzeel - Korg and PPG synthesizers, grand piano, organ
 David Paton - fretless bass
 Mel Collins - saxophone
 "Missing" (Latimer) – 4:04
 Haydn Bendall - PPG voices
 Andy Latimer - all the other instruments
 "After Words" (Ton Scherpenzeel) – 1:55
 Ton Scherpenzeel - electric grand piano, accordion, Prophet synthesizer
 "Long Goodbyes" – 5:08
 Andy Latimer - guitar, flute
 Chris Rainbow - lead vocals
 Ton Scherpenzeel - grand piano, Prophet synthesizer
 David Paton - fretless bass
 Paul Burgess - drums

Camel Productions Digital Remaster (2004)
 "In the Arms of Waltzing Frauleins"
 "Refugee"
 "Vopos"
 "Cloak and Dagger Man"
 "Stationary Traveller"
 "West Berlin"
 "Fingertips"
 "Missing"
 "After Words"
 "Long Goodbyes"
 "Pressure Points" (bonus track, extended mix)

Cherry Red Records reissue (2009)
 "Pressure Points"
 "Refugee"
 "Vopos"
 "Cloak and Dagger Man"
 "Stationary Traveller"
 "West Berlin"
 "Fingertips"
 "Missing"
 "After Words"
 "Long Goodbyes"
 "In the Arms of Waltzing Frauleins" (bonus track)
 "Pressure Points" (bonus track, extended 12" single version)

Personnel

Camel
 Andy Latimer – electric, acoustic & 12 string guitars, bass, synthesizers, piano, drum synthesiser, flute, lead vocals
 Ton Scherpenzeel – organ, grand piano, Prophet synthesizer, Yamaha CS-80, Juno 60, Korg, PPG, accordion
 Paul Burgess – drums

Additional Personnel
 David Paton – bass (A 3, 4), fretless bass (B 2, 5), backing vocals
 Chris Rainbow – lead vocals (A 4, B 10)
 Mel Collins – sax (B 2)
 Haydn Bendall – Fairlight synthesizer (A 1, 3), PPG synthesizer (B 3)

Production and Other Credits
Engineered by Dave Hutchins
Mixed by Greg Ladanyi, Haydn Bendall and Andy Latimer
Artwork by Artifex Studio, London

Charts

References

 The Rough Guide to Rock. (2003). United Kingdom: Rough Guides. p.165

1984 albums
Camel (band) albums
Decca Records albums
Concept albums